Bazartete (also known as Bazar Tete) is a village located in East Timor, comprising a subdistrict of Liquiçá District, located on a mountain top deep in the rain forest, just to the southeast of Liquiçá township. The area and its surrounding villages was the site of numerous cases of intimidation, rape and murder committed by members of the Besi Merah Putih militia group following and during the autonomy vote of 1999.

Notable people 

 Brigida Antónia Correia - agricultural scientist and MP (2007-18)

Populated places in Liquiçá District